This article describes the system of transport in Senegal, both public and private.This system comprises roads (both paved and unpaved), rail transport, water transport, and air transportation.

Roads

The system of roads in Senegal is extensive by West African standards, with paved roads reaching each corner of the country and all major towns.

International highways
Dakar is the endpoint of three routes in the Trans-African Highway network. These are as follows:
Cairo-Dakar Highway which crosses the edge of the Sahara
Dakar-Ndjamena Highway which links the countries of the Sahel, also called the Trans-Sahelian Highway
Dakar-Lagos Highway running along the West African coast and called by the Economic Community of West African States (ECOWAS) the Trans–West African Coastal Highway (though ECOWAS considers this route to start in Nouakchott, Mauritania).
 
Senegal's road network links closely with those of the Gambia, since the shortest route between south-western districts on the one hand and west-central and north-western districts on the other is through the Gambia.

Motorways
The only operational motorway in Senegal currently runs for 34 km. between Dakar and Diamniadio, and it is a toll motorway. A new part of the motorway, of 16.5 km. is currently under construction, which will reach the Blaise Diagne International Airport. Another section of 50 km. is also under construction, linking the airport to Thiès; and the 115 km. stretch from Thiès to Touba, the final destination of the planned motorway, will start under construction in the near future.

National roads
The most important roads in Senegal are prefixed "N" and numbered from 1 to 7:

N1: Dakar – Mbour - Fatick - Kaolack – Tambacounda – Kidira – (Mali)
N2: Pout – Thiès – Louga - St-Louis – Richard Toll – Ouro Sogui – Kidira - (Mali)
N3: Thiès – Diourbel – Touba – Linguère – Ouro Sogui
N4:  Kaolack – (Trans-Gambia Highway) – Bignona – Ziguinchor – (Guinea-Bissau)
N5: Bignona – Diouloulou – (Gambia) - Sokone - Kaolack
N6: Tambacounda – Vélingara - Kolda – Ziguinchor – (Guinea-Bissau)
N7: Ouro Sogui - Tambacounda – Niokolo-Koba – Kédougou – Guinea

Regional roads
R20, R21, R22
R30, R31, R32
R60, R61
R70

Major incidents
 Senegal bus crash (2023)

Railways 

total: 906 km  
narrow gauge: 906 km of  gauge (70 km double track)

Maps 
 UN Map

Ground transport 

 
There were an estimated 4,271 km of paved roads and 10,305 km of unpaved roads as of 1996.

Taxis (black-yellow or blue-yellow in color) are cheap, numerous and available everywhere in Dakar.  It is customary to negotiate the fare since most meters installed in the taxis are broken or missing.  For travel outside Dakar, public transportation is available but often unreliable and uncomfortable.

Waterways 
897 km total; 785 km on the Senegal river, and 112 km on the Saloum River.

Ports and harbours 
 Dakar - railhead
 Kaolack, Matam, Podor, Richard Toll, Saint-Louis, Ziguinchor

Dakar has one of the largest deep-water seaports along the West African coast. Its deep-draft structure and  access channel allows round-the-clock access to the port. Its current infrastructure includes tanker vessel loading and unloading terminals, a container terminal with a storage capacity of 3000 20-foot-equivalent units, a cereals and fishing port, a dedicated phosphate terminal and a privately run ship repair facility. The port's location at the extreme western point of Africa, at the crossroad of the major sea-lanes linking Europe to South America, makes it a natural port of call for shipping companies. Total freight traffic averages 10 million metric tons.

Airports 

There were an estimated 20 airports in 1999. Blaise Diagne International Airport in Diass became the hub of the sub-region. Dakar is linked to numerous African cities by air, and daily flights go to Europe.  Delta Air Lines flies daily to/from Atlanta/Dakar/Johannesburg.  South African Airways flies daily to New York and Washington, D.C. from Johannesburg via Dakar. The old Léopold Sédar Senghor International Airport in Dakar is now only exists as a cargo hub.

See also 
 Senegal

References 

 CIA Fact Book for SG

External links